Cyclododecatrienes are cyclic trienes with the formula C12H18. Four isomers are known for 1,5,9-cyclododecatriene.  The trans,trans,cis-isomer is a precursor in the production of nylon-12.

Production
The trans,trans,cis-isomer is obtained by cyclotrimerization of butadiene catalyzed by a mixture of titanium tetrachloride and an organoaluminium co-catalyst.  Production capacity in 1995 was 8000 tons.

As aforementioned, titanium catalysts predominantly produce the important cis,trans,trans- isomer. The all-trans isomer is, however, the product from nickel- and chromium-catalyzed trimerization reactions. The yield of cyclododecatriene through these methods is often greater than 80%. The principal side products are the dimers and oligomers of butadiene.

Properties
All of the isomers of 1,5,9-cyclododecatriene are colorless, possess typical terpene-like odors, and have low melting points. The all-trans isomer melts at 34 °C while the other three isomers melt below room temperature. All of the isomers behave like typical olefins. The all-trans and cis,trans,trans isomers in particular tend to form complexes with transition metals. They also undergo transannular reactions and isomerization.

Application
Cyclododecatriene is the raw material for the production of dodecanedioic acid (4) through hydrogenation to cyclododecane (2) followed by air oxidation in the presence of boric acid at elevated temperatures to a mixture of the alcohol (3a) and the ketone (3b). In the final step this mixture oxidized further by nitric acid: 

The alcohol (3a) and the ketone (3b) can be purified from the alcohol/ketone mixture under different reaction conditions.  Pure cyclododecanol (3a) can be produced from the hydrogenation of the mixture in the presence of a copper-chromium catalyst at 30 MPa and 160 ˚C. Pure cyclododecanone (3b) can be produced through the dehydrogenation of the mixture over copper or copper-chromium catalysts on an active support at a temperature range of 230–245 ˚C and atmospheric pressure. Pure cyclododecanone can then be converted into cyclododecanone oxime, which yields laurolactam after Beckmann rearrangement. Laurolactam is the precursor to several plastics, such as polyamide 12, which is also known as nylon 12.

2012  Evonik fire 
In March 2012, a fire at the Marl Chemical Park operated by Evonik Industries in Marl, Germany, stopped production for an expected duration of several months. The plant produced a substantial proportion of the world's production of CDT, particularly that needed to produce laurolactam, a precursor to the polyamide PA12. This in turn led to concerns for global production of finished goods, particularly in the automotive industry.  Other biobased polyamides, not dependent on laurolactam or CDT, have been put forward as alternative materials.

References

Cycloalkenes